Sarwar Hossain (born 16 January 1966) is a retired Bangladeshi major general who was former Military Secretary to the President of Bangladesh.

Early life and education 
Hossain studied at BAF Shaheen College Kurmitola and Adamjee Cantonment College. He completed his master's degree in Management from the University of Hyderabad.

Hossain has completed his PhD in Bangladesh Liberation War from the University of Dhaka in 2018.

Career 
Hossain was commissioned from Bangladesh Military Academy with 15 BMA Long Course in the Corps of Infantry in December 1986. He was Principal of Military Collegiate School Khulna. Hossain commanded an Infantry Brigade in Rangamati District.

Hossain served as Director of Internal affairs bureau of DGFI till 2016. In November 2016, he was debuted as the Military Secretary to the President of Bangladesh. He replaced Major General Abul Hossain. He was succeeded by Major General S. M. Salahuddin Islam in December 2020.

Sarwar is a regular contributor in different journals and magazines on contemporary topics. His first book, titled Random Thoughts, was a collection of several articles on diverse issues. He is the author of 1971: Resistance, Resilience, and Redemption, a work on the liberation war of Bangladesh, published in 2019.

On 17 August 2022, Hossain was appointed an Independent Director of Simtex Industries Limited. He is the Chairman of AFC Health Limited which has three hospitals in Bangladesh. He is an adjunct faculty at North South University.

References 

Living people
1966 births
Bangladeshi military personnel
Bangladesh Army generals
University of Hyderabad alumni
University of Dhaka alumni
Academic staff of the North South University